The following is a list of the programs currently broadcast on INC TV, a free-to-air religious channel owned by the Christian Era Broadcasting Service International, a broadcast evangelization arm of the Iglesia ni Cristo. Selected programs are also been aired on Net 25 every weekday afternoons and evenings and weekend mornings, afternoons, and evenings.

Current programming

Preaching and Bible-based discussions
Ang Gampanin ng Pamamahala sa Iglesia Ni Cristo (2022)
Ang Iglesia ni Cristo* (2011-2012)
Ang Matuod Nga Pagtuo (2018)
Ang Pagbubunyag (new season) (2012)
Ang Tamang Daan* (new season) (2012-2020)
INCMS (2021)
Biblia Ang Sasagot* (2018)
Daan ng Buhay* (2021)
El Mensaje* (2013)
Gabay sa Mabuting Asal* (new season) (2012)
Iglesia ni Cristo International Edition* (2012)
The Iglesia ni Cristo and the Bible* (2012)
Kini Ang Kamatuoran (2018)
Pasugo* (new season) (2012)
Ti Pudno A Dalan (2018)
That's In the Bible (2012)
The Answer 答案 (2018)
Ang Permanenteng Solusyon (The Permanent Solution) 105th Anniversary Special (2019)
Bro. EVM 10th Anniversary Special The Only Basis in Serving God (2019)
Reconnect (2018-2019-2020)
The Message Special (2010-2012; 2020)
Ang Kahalagahan Ng Mapabilang Sa Gawain Ng Sugo Ng Diyos Iglesia Ni Cristo 107th Anniversary Special (2021)
The Message (Philippine TV program) (2012)
Iglesia Ni Cristo 108th Anniversary An INCTV Special (2022)
A Mensagem (2021)
INCMS Special* (2021)
Faith Speaks (2012-2022)
FYM 134 (2020)
136th Birth Anniversary Of Brother Felix Y. Manalo* (2022)
Face The Truth* (2012)
Christian Family Youth Summit* (2022)
Le Rendez-Vous (2012-2013, 2022)

Church-centered newscasts
Church News Highlights (2012)
Church News Monthly Highlights (2012)
Worldwide Lingap Sa Mamamayan Special Coverage (2022)
Bureau Reports (2018)
CFO News (2018-2021)
CFO Today (2021)
CFO Updates (2021)
Church News Special Report (2012)
INC News Junior* (2016)
Executive News*** (2012)
Executive News Feature Stories (2012)
Former Pastors and Religious Leaders Special Features (2017)
The Good News (2018)
Ibalita ang Pagliligtas (2018)
Iglesia ni Cristo News Live (2018)
Iglesia ni Cristo News Live Special Coverage (2014)
Iglesia ni Cristo News Weekend* (2012)
INCTV News Update (2014)
INCNews World* (2018)
Maayong Balita (2017)
Iglesia Ni Cristo 105TH Anniversary Special Coverage (2019)
INC News Special Report (2019)
Worldwide Walk Special Coverage (2018)
INC News Live Update (2018-2019)
Iglesia Ni Cristo News Highlights (2018)
The Good News Special Report (2019)
INC Unity Games (2012)
COVID-19 Bulletin (2021)
NEGH Bulletin (2022)
Iglesia Ni Cristo News Updates (2022)

Convert stories and documentaries
Blessed Moments 10 Years of Dynamic Leadership (2019)
Itanyag  (new season) (2014-2018)
Landas ng Buhay: Drama Anthology*** (2012)
Paninidigan'''*** (2012)Stories of Faith (new season) (2012, 2018)Continuing Legacy (new season) (2019)Eye N' See (2019)Paglingap Sa Katuwa (2022)God's Great Work In Africa (2022)YOLANDA: Ang Pagbangon: An INCTV Documentary Special (2018)10 Days In Africa (2019)Balik-Tanaw 2018 The INCTV Year-End Special (2018)Look 2019 INCTV Year-End Special (2019)Finish Line (2014)Turning Point* (2021)Livelihood Programs During Pandemic (2021)Iglesia Ni Cristo First Eco-Farming Project In The USA (2021)INCTV Special (2021)INCTV Documentary (2021)Mga Dakilang Gawa Ng Diyos Sa Africa (2022)Itanyag Ang Pagliligtas* (2014-2015)

Informative and edutainment
 INC Kids Corner (2014)AveNEU (2016-2026)Blueprint (2018)INC Kids Adventures* (2022)Christian Society for the Deaf* (2018)Don't Give Up* (2020-2021)#Hashtag Bureau Edition*** (2013)The INC Giving Show (2012)INC Media (2017)Iglesia Ni Cristo Chronicles (2012)INCTV Public Service (2013)Insight*** (2018-2020)Let's Talk International (2012)Lingap sa Mamamayan*** (2012)Lingap Sa Visayas (2022)NegosUniversity (2021-2022)Mr. and Mrs. Chef Stay At Home Edition*** (2013–2016; 2018-present)Profile (2014-2017)Pundasyon*** (2014)Taga Rito Kami (2012-2018)Trabaho Ko 'To!*** (new season) (2013–2016; 2018-2019, 2020)The Kadiwa Show (2018-2020)Unlad (2018)Tropa (2022)Time To Draw Live (2018-2019-2020)#Hashtag Stay At Home Edition (2020)CFO Life (2020)Gourmade At Home* (2021)CFO Day @ CEBSI (2020)CEBSI Academy Online (2020-2021)Your Light Forever*(2020)#NewNormal* (2021)Lingap Stories / Lingap Updates* (2021)INC Unity Games* (2012)

MusicExecutive News Special (2021-2022)Musikoncert (2021)INCTV Interactive Roadshow (2022)Iglesia Ni Cristo International Voice Competition (2019)CFO Day (2022)Spotlight (new season)Resonate: Music That Matters (2017)Resonate (2022)108th (2022)Songs Of Faith, Love, & Hope: Binhi Edition* (2018)Songs Of Faith, Love, & Hope: Kadiwa Edition* (2018)Songs Of Faith, Love, & Hope: Husband & Wife Edition* (2017)Songs Of Faith, Love, & Hope: PNK Edition* (2019)Songs Of Faith, Love, & Hope: At Home Edition* (2020)Songs Of Faith, Love, & Hope: Christian Family Edition* (2019)Songs Of Faith, Love, & Hope: Lights Of The World Edition (2020)Songs Of Faith, Love, & Hope: Kadiwa & Binhi International Edition (2021)Songs Of Faith, Love & Hope: Buklod Edition (2022)Musical Concert (2022)INC A Capella 6th Anniversary Concert (2020)Noteworthy (2022)INCMV AWARDS (2020-2021)Unity Junction Radio (2020-2022)Iglesia Ni Cristo 107th Anniversary Special (2021)Promoting Christian Culture (2020)INConcert (2020)Little Juan's Playlist Stay-At-Home Edition* (2020)INC Music Videos (2010-2012; 2018-2019; 2020)MusiKo Songs (new season)MusiKo*** (2019)MusiKcover Musikover*** (2021)United With The Church Administration (2020)INC Playlist App Live (2021)EVM Awards* (2021)FYM 136 Special Concert (55th Anniversary of Ecclesiastical District of Quezon East)* (2022)

Movie blockINCinema 2021 (2013)FYM 130 LEGACY Iglesia Ni Cristo Short Film Series Commemorating the 130th Birth Anniversary of Brother Felix Y. Manalo (2018)Felix Manalo (film)Kapayapaan Sa Gitna Ng Digmaan (2017)Rendebu (2018)

DramaL.I.F.E.: Love, Inspiration, Faith, Entertainment (2020)NINGAS: Mga Dakilang Kasaysayan Ng Mga Ministro Ng Diyos* (2020)Blessed Love (2020-2021)

TeleRadyoINC Radio Bulletin International (2015)
Masayang Tahanan''' (2015)

SitcomOne For All, All For One (November 6, 2022)

Upcoming ProgramsLet's Take A Break (2022)
MusiKo Season 3*** (2022)

(*) also aired on Net 25 (owned by Eagle Broadcasting Corporation, sister station of Iglesia ni Cristo through Christian Era Broadcasting Service International.)
(***) also aired on Net 25 (international & local)
NOTE: Some INC programming also aired on Net 25, during sign-off hours (only for Cable and Satellite TV; while Analog and Digital Free TV is not available & some programming of INC aired on daytime/afternoon time/primetime).

Previously aired programming

References

INCTV